Government College of Women are public Junior Women's colleges in Pakistan. In 1972, Government of Pakistan nationalized nearly all schools and colleges in Pakistan. The government renamed colleges and many Women's colleges were prefixed with Government College as in Government College of Women and Government Degree Girls College.

The Government College of Women are two-year Junior colleges or Intermediate colleges that are equivalent to Eleventh grade and Twelfth grade High School in United States. These junior colleges award Higher Secondary School Certificate. These colleges concentrate on either Science or Arts educational curriculum. The successful completion of two-year Science curriculum awards F.Sc. certificate. While the successful completion of two-year Arts curriculum awards F.A. certificate. These certificates are equivalent to the High school diploma in USA.

List of Government College of Women

Balochistan

FATA

Gilgit-Baltistan

Islamabad

Pakhtunkhwa
Government women college mansehra

Punjab
 Government College for Women Dhoke Kala Khan
 Government Degree College Attock
 Viqar un Nisa College for Women, Rawalpindi
 Government College for Women, Lahore
 Government Post Graduate College for Women, Satellite Town, Rawalpindi
 Government College For Women, Bahawalpur
 Government College For Women, Chakwal 
 Government College for Women, Jhelum

Sindh
 Government College for Women F.B. Area, Gulberg Town, Karachi
 Government College for Women Korangi-4, Korangi Town, Karachi
 Government College for Women Korangi–6, Korangi Town, Karachi
 Government College for Women Nazimabad, Liaquatabad Town, Karachi
 Government College for Women New Karachi, New Karachi Town, Karachi
 Government College for Women North Karachi, New Karachi Town, Karachi
 Government College for Women Saudabad, Malir Town, Karachi
 Government College for Women Shahrah-e-Liaquat, Saddar Town, Karachi
 Khatoon-e-Pakistan Government College for Women, Stadium Road, Karachi

See also
 Education in Pakistan
 Intermediate college
 Junior college
 Government College (disambiguation)
 Higher Secondary School Certificate
 Faculty in Science (Certificate) (F.Sc.)
 Faculty in Arts (Certificate) (F.A.)
 Government Degree Girls College

References

Women's universities and colleges in Pakistan